is a 1995 Japan-exclusive football video game for the Super Famicom.

Summary

Ace Striker was licensed by Italian Football League and AIC (Associazione Italiana Calciatori) featuring all clubs and footballers from the Italian Serie A (Season 1994–95).

The football players are drawn in the "deformed" anime style. There's no different formations to choose from, but all the players (except the goalkeeper) can be positioned anywhere in the field. During a football match, an animated image will appear whenever a goal is scored. One of the particularities or flaws of this soccer game is that during the penalty shoot-out, the goalkeeper can move and jump before the rival player actually kicks the ball.

Reception
On release, Famicom Tsūshin scored the game a 20 out of 40.

See also
 Super Formation Soccer 95: della Serie A, football video game licensed by Italian Football League and Associazione Italiana Calciatori

References

External links
 Shijō Saikyō League Serie A: Ace Striker at MobyGames
 Shijō Saikyō League Serie A: Ace Striker at Giant Bomb
 Shijō Saikyō League Serie A: Ace Striker at superfamicom.org
 Shijō Saikyō League Serie A: Ace Striker at super-famicom.jp 

1995 video games
Association football video games
Japan-exclusive video games
Sports video games set in Italy
Super Nintendo Entertainment System games
Super Nintendo Entertainment System-only games
TNN games
Video games set in 1995
Multiplayer and single-player video games
Video games developed in Japan
Video games scored by Atsuhiro Motoyama